Balal  is a village and a Grama Panchayat in Kasaragod district in the state of Kerala, India.

Demographics
As of 2011 Census, Balal had a population of 9,936 with 4,885 males and 5,051 females. In Balal, 9.84% of the population was under 6 years of age. Balal village had an average literacy of 87.66% lower than the state average of 94%: male literacy was 90.58% and female literacy was 84.87%.

State Government Offices
 Balal Sub Registrar's Office
 Balal Govt Higher Secondary School, Balal Village Office Balal Krishi Bhavan Balal grama panchayath Balal home dispensary

Balal Grama Panchayath

Transportation
This village is connected to Karnataka state through Panathur. Its nearest town is Vellarikundu. There is a 20-km road from Panathur to Sullia in Karnataka from where Bangalore and Mysore can be easily accessed. Locations in Kerala can be accessed by driving towards the western side. The nearest railway station is Kanhangad on Shoranur-Mangalore Section under Southern railway. The nearest airports are Kannur in the south and Mangalore in the north.

References

Nileshwaram area